Sereno is an unincorporated community located in Bois Brule Township in Perry County, Missouri, United States. Sereno is located approximately five miles northeast of Perryville.

Etymology

The early settlers of Sereno named the community Serena, meaning “a clean, respectable place”. However, when establishing a post office they discovered a place by that name already existed in Missouri, so the name was changed to Sereno.

History 

In 1884, Thomas Moore gave a small tract of his land along Chester Road to William Mattingly for the purpose of building a general store, which was soon followed by a grist mill.  A post office operated from 1888-1905. The predominantly Catholic town established Our Lady of Victory Catholic parish in 1908.

References 

Villages in Perry County, Missouri
Villages in Missouri